Henry Whitcombe (15 August 1900 – 2 April 1984) was an English army officer in the Royal Engineers, cricketer and railway artist. He played three matches for Essex in 1922.

References

External links

1900 births
1984 deaths
Royal Engineers officers
English cricketers
Essex cricketers
People from Buckinghamshire
20th-century English painters
English male painters
20th-century British Army personnel
20th-century English male artists
Military personnel from Buckinghamshire